Xenisthmus oligoporus, the few-pored wriggler, is a species of goby from the family Eleotridae. It is found in the Red Sea off Saudi Arabia.

References

oligoporus
Fish described in 2017